Saer de Quincy, 1st Earl of Winchester (c. 11553 November 1219) was one of the leaders of the baronial rebellion against John, King of England, and a major figure in both the kingdoms of Scotland and England in the decades around the turn of the twelfth and thirteenth centuries.

Scottish Upbringing

Although he was an Anglo-Norman, Saer de Quincy's father, Robert de Quincy, had married and held important lordships in the Scottish kingdom of his cousin King William the Lion. His mother, Orabilis, was the heiress of the lordship of Leuchars and through her Robert became lord over lands in Fife, Perth and Lothian (see below).

Saer's own rise to prominence in England came partly through his marriage to Margaret, the younger sister of Robert de Beaumont, Earl of Leicester. Earl Robert died in 1204, and left Margaret as co-heiress to the vast earldom along with her elder sister. The estate was split in half, and after the final division was ratified in 1207, de Quincy was made Earl of Winchester.

Earl of Winchester

Following his marriage, Winchester became a prominent military and diplomatic figure in England. There is no evidence of any close alliance with King John, however, and his rise to importance was probably due to his newly acquired magnate status and the family connections that underpinned it.

Saer seems to have developed a close personal relationship with his cousin, Robert Fitzwalter (died 1235). In 1203, they served as co-commanders of the garrison at the major fortress of Vaudreuil in Normandy. They surrendered the castle without a fight to Philip II of France, fatally weakening the English position in northern France. Although popular opinion seems to have blamed them for the capitulation, a royal writ is extant stating that the castle was surrendered at King John's command, and both Winchester and Fitzwalter endured personal humiliation and heavy ransoms at the hands of the French.

In Scotland, he was perhaps more successful. In 1211 to 1212, the Earl of Winchester commanded an imposing retinue of a hundred knights and a hundred serjeants in William the Lion's campaign against the Mac William rebels, a force which some historians have suggested may have been the mercenary force from Brabant lent to the campaign by John.

Magna Carta

In 1215, when the baronial rebellion broke out, Robert Fitzwalter became the military commander, and the Earl of Winchester joined him, acting as one of the chief authors of Magna Carta and negotiators with John; both cousins were among the 25 guarantors of the Magna Carta. De Quincy fought against John in the troubles that followed the sealing of the Charter, and, again with Fitzwalter, travelled to France to invite Prince Louis of France to take the English throne. He and Fitzwalter were subsequently among the most committed and prominent supporters of Louis's candidature for the kingship, against both John and the infant Henry III.

The Fifth Crusade

When military defeat cleared the way for Henry III to take the throne, de Quincy went on crusade, perhaps in fulfilment of an earlier vow.  In 1219 he left to join the Fifth Crusade, then besieging Damietta. While in the east, he fell sick and died. He was buried in Acre, the capital of the Kingdom of Jerusalem, rather than in Egypt, and his heart was brought back and interred at Garendon Abbey near Loughborough, a house endowed by his wife's family.

Family

The family of de Quincy had arrived in England after the Norman Conquest, and took their name from Cuinchy in the Arrondissement of Béthune; the personal name "Saer" was used by them over several generations. Both names are variously spelt in primary sources and older modern works, the first name being sometimes rendered Saher or Seer, and the surname as Quency or Quenci.

The first recorded Saer de Quincy (known to historians as "Saer I") was lord of the manor of Long Buckby in Northamptonshire in the earlier twelfth century, and second husband of Matilda of St Liz, stepdaughter of King David I of Scotland by Maud of Northumbria. This marriage produced two sons, Saer II and Robert de Quincy. It was Robert, the younger son, who was the father of the Saer de Quincy who eventually became Earl of Winchester. By her first husband Robert Fitz Richard, Matilda was also the paternal grandmother of Earl Saer's close ally, Robert Fitzwalter.

Robert de Quincy seems to have inherited no English lands from his father, and pursued a knightly career in Scotland, where he is recorded from around 1160 as a close companion of his cousin, King William the Lion. By 1170 he had married Orabilis, heiress of the Scottish lordship of Leuchars and, through her, he became lord of an extensive complex of estates north of the border which included lands in Fife, Strathearn and Lothian.

Saer de Quincy, the son of Robert de Quincy and Orabilis of Leuchars, was raised largely in Scotland. His absence from English records for the first decades of his life has led some modern historians and genealogists to confuse him with his uncle, Saer II, who took part in the rebellion of Henry the Young King in 1173, when the future Earl of Winchester can have been no more than a toddler. Saer II's line ended without direct heirs, and his nephew and namesake would eventually inherit his estate, uniting his primary Scottish holdings with the family's Northamptonshire patrimony, and possibly some lands in France.

Issue

Sometime between 1188 and 1193 de Quincy married Margaret, youngest daughter of Robert de Beaumont, 3rd Earl of Leicester. By his wife Margaret de Beaumont, Earl Saer had:

Lora, who married Sir William de Valognes, Chamberlain of Scotland.
Arabella, who married Sir Richard Harcourt.
Robert (died 1217); before 1206 he married Hawise of Chester, 1st Countess of Lincoln, sister and co-heiress of Randolph de Blondeville, 4th Earl of Chester.
Roger, who succeeded his father as earl of Winchester (though he did not take formal possession of the earldom until after his mother's death).
 (second son of that name; died 1257), who married Elen, daughter of the Welsh prince Llywelyn the Great.
Hawise, who married Hugh de Vere, 4th Earl of Oxford.
Mary, who married Hugh le Despenser (sheriff).
John de Quincy
Saher de Quincy

References

Sources

Background reading

"Winchester", in The Complete Peerage, 2nd ed., ed. G.E.C. et al., Vol.12ii. pp. 745–751
Sidney Painter, "The House of Quency, 1136-1264", Medievalia et Humanistica, 11 (1957) 3–9; reprinted in his book Feudalism and Liberty
Grant G. Simpson, "An Anglo-Scottish Baron of the Thirteenth century: the Acts of Roger de Quincy Earl of Winchester and Constable of Scotland" (Unpublished PhD Thesis, Edinburgh 1963).
Frederick Lewis Weis, Ancestral Roots of Certain American Colonists Who Came to America Before 1700 (7th Edition, 1992,), 58–60.

External links
Medieval Lands Project on Saher de Quincy

1170s births
1219 deaths
Earls of Winchester
Norman warriors
Magna Carta barons
Christians of the Fifth Crusade
Scoto-Normans